Ernest Noral Jerome Anderson (November 28, 1902 – January 27, 1992) was an American farmer and politician.

Early life 
Anderson was born on a farm in Frost, Minnesota. He graduated from Bricelyn High School in Bricelyn, Minnesota.

Career 
Anderson lived with his wife and family, in Frost, Minnesota, and was a farmer. Anderson served on the Frost, Minnesota School Board and was president of the school board. He served in the Minnesota Senate from 1955 to 1972 and was a Republican.

Personal life 
Anderson died at St. Luke's Lutheran Home in Blue Earth, Minnesota. His funeral and burial was in Frost, Minnesota.

References

1902 births
1992 deaths
People from Faribault County, Minnesota
Farmers from Minnesota
School board members in Minnesota
Republican Party Minnesota state senators